The Dinosaurs of Waterhouse Hawkins is a 2001 picture book by Barbara Kerley and illustrated by Brian Selznick. The book tells the story of Benjamin Waterhouse Hawkins and how he built the Crystal Palace dinosaurs. The book was a recipient of the 2002 Caldecott Honor for its illustrations.
In 2010, Weston Woods adapted this book to a film narrated by Jonathan Pryce. It won an ALA Notable Video award in 2011 by the Association of Library Services for Children (ALSC).

References

2001 children's books
American picture books
Caldecott Honor-winning works